The British Committee on the Theory of International Politics was a group of scholars created in 1959 under the chairmanship of the Cambridge historian Herbert Butterfield, with financial aid from the Rockefeller Foundation, that met periodically in Cambridge, Oxford, London and Brighton to discuss the principal problems and a range of aspects of the theory and history of international relations. The Committee developed a study of international society and the nature of world politics, which have had an important impact that continues in the present day.

Meetings
Under the guidance of Herbert Butterfield, Martin Wight, Adam Watson and Hedley Bull, the British Committee on the Theory of International Politics met three times a year for an almost thirty-year period from the 1950s to the 1980s, once or twice in Italy. In 1974 a three days meeting (27-30 September) was held at Villa Serbelloni, Bellagio, in agreement with Rockefeller foundation.

Publications
They produced books, essays, article, and they regularly wrote a series of papers specially conceived for the Committee which provoked lively internal discussions and most of which are still unpublished.

Selected works
Herbert Butterfield, Martin Wight (eds.), Diplomatic Investigations: Essays in the Theory of International Politics (London: Allen & Unwin, 1966).
Hedley Bull, Adam Watson (eds.), The Expansion of International Society (Oxford: Clarendon Press, 1984). 
Martin Wight, Systems of States ed. Hedley Bull (Leicester: Leicester University Press, 1977).

References 
Brunello Vigezzi, 'Il «British Committee on the Theory of International Politics» (1958-1985)', in Hedley Bull, Adam Watson (eds), L’espansione della societa’ internazionale (Milan: Jaca Book, 1994).  
Adam Watson, 'The British Committee for the Theory of International Politics: Some Historical Notes', 1998, University of Leeds . 
 Olee Waever, 'Four Meanings of International Society', in B. Roberson (eds), International Society and the Development of International Relations Theory (London: Pinter, 1998) 93-108.
 Tim Dunne, Inventing International Society (London: St. Martin Press, 1998).
Alessandro Colombo, 'La società anarchica tra continuità e crisi. La scuola inglese e le istituzioni internazionali', Rassegna italiana di sociologia, 44:2, 2003, 237-255, available on-line, Jura Gentium - Rivista di filosofia del diritto internazionale e della politica globale .
Brunello Vigezzi, The British Committee on the Theory of International Politics 1954-1985: The Rediscovery of History (Milan: Edizioni Unicopli, 2005).
Caroline Kennedy-Pipe e Nicholas Rengger, 'BISA at Thirty: Reflections on Three Decades of British International Relations Scholarship', Review of International Studies, 32:2006, pp. 665–676. 
Ian Hall, The International Thought of Martin Wight (New York, Palgrave, 2006).
Michele Chiaruzzi, Politica di potenza nell'età del Leviatano. La teoria internazionale di Martin Wight (Bologna: Il Mulino, 2008).
Silvia Maria Pizzetti (ed), La storia e la teoria della vita internazionale. Interpretazioni e discussioni (Milan: Edizioni Unicopli, 2009). With chapters by Alfredo Canavero, Alessandro Colombo, Michele Chiaruzzi, Elisabetta Brighi, Andrea Saccoman, Guido Formigoni, Giovanni Scirocco, Maria Matilde Benzoni, Giovanna Daverio Rocchi, Barbara Baldi, Elisa Orrù, Brunello Vigezzi.
Luca G. Castellin, Società e anarchia. La "English School" e il pensiero politico internazionale (Roma: Carocci, 2018).

External links
Reconvening the English School of International Relations Theory

Notes

Learned societies of the United Kingdom
English School (international relations)
1959 establishments in the United Kingdom